Mechtild Rothe (born 10 August 1947 in Paderborn, Germany) is a German politician who served as a Member of the European Parliament from 1984 until 2009. She is a member of the Social Democratic Party of Germany, part of the Socialist Group.

During her time in parliament, Rothe sat on the European Parliament's Committee on Industry, Research and Energy. She was a substitute for the Committee on Foreign Affairs, a member of the Delegation for relations with the countries of south-east Europe and a substitute for the Delegation to the EU-Turkey Joint Parliamentary Committee.

Career
 1965-1974: Trained and employed as a chemical laboratory technician
 1974-1978: studied German and social sciences

Education
 1978 and 1981: first and second state examination for lower secondary teaching
 1978-1984: teacher
 1975-1984
 1984-2009: Member of the European Parliament
 Vice-Chair of the SPD group in the European Parliament
 1999-2004: Delegation Chair of the EU - Cyprus Joint Parliamentary Committee
 2002-2004: Member of the Group Bureau

See also
 2004 European Parliament election in Germany

External links
 
 

1947 births
Living people
Social Democratic Party of Germany MEPs
MEPs for Germany 1984–1989
MEPs for Germany 1989–1994
MEPs for Germany 1994–1999
MEPs for Germany 1999–2004
MEPs for Germany 2004–2009
20th-century women MEPs for Germany
21st-century women MEPs for Germany
People from Paderborn